Chitasida is a genus of moths of the family Erebidae. The genus was erected by George Hampson in 1926.

Species
Chitasida diplogramma Hampson, 1905
Chitasida duplicata Grünberg, 1910

References

Calpinae